Years (by One Thousand Fingertips) is the third studio album by Canadian folk rock band Attack in Black, released on March 10, 2009 on Dine Alone Records. The album was released both on CD and on one thousand 12" vinyl records. Singles released from the album are "Beasts" (February 24, 2009) and "Liberties" (July 2009).  The layout and photography present in both CD and vinyl versions were by Daniel Romano and Ian Kehoe.

Track listing

Personnel
Attack In Black
Daniel Romano – lead vocals, guitar
Spencer Burton – guitar, organ, vocals
Ian Kehoe – bass, vocals
Ian Romano – drums, percussion

Additional musicians
Julie Fader – guest vocals on "Birmingham"
Penelope Smart – guest vocals on "Liberties"
Ilse Kramer – guest vocals on "Liberties"
Katie – guest vocals on "Liberties"
Julie Doiron – guest vocals on "I'm a Rock"
Shotgun Jimmie – keyboard on "I'm a Rock"
Julien Brousseau – chime performance on "Liberties"

References

Dine Alone Records albums
Attack in Black albums
2009 albums